The Pike Lake Unit of the Kettle Moraine State Forest is a  unit of the Wisconsin state park system.  The unit is located just east of Hartford, Wisconsin on State Highway 60, on the east shore of the  Pike Lake. It was dedicated by Wisconsin governor Patrick J. Lucey in June 1971.  

The park provides a campground, a beach, an observation tower, hiking and biking trails and a naturalist program. A section of the Ice Age National Scenic Trail runs through the park as it follows the Kettle Moraine.

External links
 Kettle Moraine State Forest - Pike Lake Unit

Protected areas established in 1960
Protected areas of Washington County, Wisconsin
Kettle Moraine State Forest
1960 establishments in Wisconsin